Alexander Heights is a suburb of Perth, Western Australia within the City of Wanneroo.

Originally named in 1977 as "Alinjarra", an Aboriginal word for "north", this suburb was renamed Alexander Heights in 1987. The name is derived from Alexander Drive, the main arterial road into the area, which forms the suburb's eastern boundary. The road was in turn named after Mr S.B. Alexander, a former Wanneroo Road Board member.

The suburb contains the Alinjarra Primary School, which covers from kindergarten to year 6. It hosts a range of sports programs and English courses to help the large number of recent immigrants, mostly of African, Arabic, Irish or English descent, moving into the area.

References

Suburbs of Perth, Western Australia
Suburbs of the City of Wanneroo